Simara Gold Cup  is an annual football knockout tournament held in Simara, Nepal. It is organised by Simara FC (formerly known as Nawa Jan Jagriti Yuwa Club). Currently, the tournament is sponsored by Vishwokarma Cement.

Table

Top performing clubs

References

Football cup competitions in Nepal
2010 establishments in Nepal